Pine Run is a  long tributary to South Branch French Creek in Erie County, Pennsylvania.  It is classed as a 1st order stream on the EPA waters Geoviewer site.

Course
Pine Run rises in Union Township of southern Erie County, Pennsylvania and flows southwest towards Union City, Pennsylvania.

Watershed
Pine Run drains 2.0 square miles of Erie Drift Plain (glacial geology).  The watershed receives an average of 46.5 in/year of precipitation.

Additional images

References

Rivers of Erie County, Pennsylvania